Ahmed Tewfik El Madani (also spelled Ahmad Toufik al-Medani etc.) (1899–1983) was an Algerian nationalist leader during the Algerian War of Independence (1954–61), and a minister of the GPRA, a provisional exile government of the Front de libération nationale (FLN). He belonged to the Association of the Ulema, an Islamic organization that formed a main pillar of the nationalist movement. After the war, he became minister of religious affairs (1962-1965) an acclaimed historian.

Ahmed El Madani produced extensive historical writings in Arabic celebrating the Muslim and Arab ancestors of Algeria.

References

1899 births
1983 deaths
Algerian rebels
National Liberation Front (Algeria) politicians
Ambassadors of Algeria to Pakistan
Algerian historians
20th-century historians